The Amplifetes was a 4-piece band from Sweden. Influences range along a broad spectrum, including 60s psychedelia, the Electric Light Orchestra, The Ramones, Elvis Costello, David Bowie, and Chicago Trax Records. The individual members have had success as songwriters and producers, working with artists such as Kelis, Britney Spears, Madonna, Kylie Minogue, and Grandmaster Flash.

The band has been active since 2008. In 2010, they released their eponymous debut album. Four singles were taken from this album: It's My Life, Whizz Kid, Somebody New, and Blinded By The Moonlight. Following this, the band toured extensively over Europe for two years.

Early summer 2012 saw the first sign of post-debut activity, as their new song Where Is The Light was launched, together with an accompanying internet video game. The full follow-up album Where Is The Light was released in early 2013, with cover artwork supplied by Storm Thorgersen and the additional singles You/Me/Evolution and You Want It.

The Amplifetes and their music have appeared in Vogue Italia, Gaffa magazine, Virgin Radio live, Empreintes-digitales, It´s Pop, Kulturnews, Zeromagazine, and Fred Perry Subculture.

The Amplifetes music have been used in various soundtrack areas. The appearance of It´s My Life in an advertisement for the Roberto Cavalli credit card starring Milla Jovovich and "Somebody New" in a Garnier Fructis promotion and the TV-series 90210 are some examples.

Discography

Remixes

    The Amplifetes remixed:

 You/Me/Evolution - Michael Cassette Remix
 Where Is The Light - Samuel Onervas Remix
 Where Is The Light - MTheM Remix
 It's my life - Van Rivers and The Subliminal Kid Remix
 It's my life - General MIDI Remix
 It's my life - Dan F Remix
 Whizz Kid - Blende Remix
 Whizz Kid - The Subliminal Kid Remix
 Somebody new - Claes Rosén Remix
 Somebody new - POLP Remix
 Somebody new - Chopstick Dub Remix
 Somebody new - Adrian Bood Remix
 Blinded by the moonlight - Little Majorette Remix
 Blinded by the moonlight - FUKKK OFFF Remix

    Remixed by The Amplifetes:
  Little Majorette - London
 Pony Pony Run Run - Walking On A Line
  Jennie Abrahamson - Hard To Come By

Computer Games
Where Is The Light video game

Promotion Videos
 It's my life - Directed by Tommy Spaanheden
 Whizz Kid - Directed by Anders Hellman
 Somebody New - Directed by Anders Hellman and Emma Hanquist
 Blinded by the moonlight - Directed by  Mattias Johansson
 Blinded by the moonlight (Fukkk Offf Remix Edit) - Directed by  Mattias Johansson & Erik Ande
The Amplifetes EPK on Vimeo
 Where Is The Light Trailer
 You/Me/Evolution - Directed By Mikel Cee Karlsson
 You Want It - Directed By Mikel Cee Karlsson

References

External links
The Amplifetes Homepage
The Amplifetes on Last.fm
The Amplifetes on Facebook
The Amplifetes on Twitter
The Amplifetes at MySpace
The Amplifetes on Blip.fm
The Amplifetes on Hype machine

Swedish musical groups
Musical groups established in 2008